KXFF (106.1 FM) is a radio station broadcasting a sports format. Licensed to Colorado City, Arizona, United States, the station is currently owned by Townsquare Media.

History
The station was assigned the call letters KCCA on 1991-05-31.  On 2001-04-25, the station changed its call sign to KZNZ, on 2003-02-18 to KMXM, and on 2006-09-20 to the current KXFF.

As of March 30, 2012, the station dropped its oldies format to become a simulcast of sister station KHKR, an ESPN Radio affiliate. 

On January 1, 2017, KXFF changed their format from classic country to adult hits, branded as "101.9 & 99.1 Dave FM".

On December 5, 2022, it was announced that KXFF changed its format from adult hits to sports, branded as "Fox Sports Radio Utah".

References

External links

XFF
Radio stations established in 1991
1991 establishments in Arizona
Sports radio stations in the United States
Townsquare Media radio stations